Paavo Olavi Lonkila (born Lång on 11 January 1923 – 22 September 2017) was a Finnish cross-country skier. He won a gold medal in the 4 × 10 km relay at the 1952 Olympics and finished third in the individual 18 km race, 11 seconds behind his teammate Tapio Mäkelä. Earlier his 4 × 10 km relay team placed second at the 1950 FIS Nordic World Ski Championships, where he finished fifth over 18 km. He won the 18 km event at the 1951 Holmenkollen ski festival. Lonkila was a farmer by occupation.

Cross-country skiing results
All results are sourced from the International Ski Federation (FIS).

Olympic Games
 2 medals – (1 gold, 1 bronze)

World Championships
 1 medal – (1 silver)

References

External links

 
 Holmenkollen winners since 1892 – click Vinnere for downloadable pdf file 
 Paavo Lonkila, a Famous Kiuruvesi sportsman

1923 births
2017 deaths
People from Kiuruvesi
Finnish male cross-country skiers
Olympic cross-country skiers of Finland
Cross-country skiers at the 1952 Winter Olympics
Olympic gold medalists for Finland
Olympic bronze medalists for Finland
Holmenkollen Ski Festival winners
Olympic medalists in cross-country skiing
FIS Nordic World Ski Championships medalists in cross-country skiing
Medalists at the 1952 Winter Olympics
Sportspeople from North Savo
20th-century Finnish people